Johannes Naumann (11 October 1917 – 22 March 2010) was a German Luftwaffe military aviator during World War II, a fighter ace credited with 34 aerial victories claimed in roughly 350 combat missions, all of which claimed over the Western Front. Following World War II, he served in the newly established West Germany's Air Force in the Bundeswehr and commanded the Helicopter Transport Wing 64.

Career
Jagdgeschwader 26 "Schlageter" (JG 26—26th Fighter Wing) was created on 1 May 1939 in Düsseldorf by renaming Jagdgeschwader 132 (JG 132—132nd Fighter Wing) and was commanded by Oberst Eduard Ritter von Schleich, a flying ace of World War I. Naumann was among the first pilots assigned to this unit following his training as a fighter pilot.

Naumann claimed his fifth and sixth confirmed aerial victory during Operation Donnerkeil. The Channel Dash operation (11–13 February 1942) by the Kriegsmarine was codenamed Operation Cerberus by the Germans. In support of this, the Luftwaffe, formulated an air superiority plan dubbed Operation Donnerkeil for the protection of the three German capital ships. Noumann was credited with two Fairey Swordfish biplane torpedo bombers from 825 Naval Air Squadron shot down at 13:45 and 13:47 on 12 February north of Gravelines.

Defense of the Reich
The United States Army Air Forces (USAAF) VIII Bomber Command, later renamed to Eighth Air Force, had begun its regular combat operations on 17 August 1942. On 6 September, VIII Bomber Command targeted the airfield at Wizernes and Abbeville Airfield, escorted by RAF Spitfire fighters. At 18:54, Naumann claimed a No. 402 Squadron Spitfire shot down north of Hallencourt. On 20 September, Naumann was transferred from 4. Staffel to 6. Staffel where he was appointed Staffelkapitän (squadron leader). He succeeded Oberleutnant Theo Lindemann who was transferred.

That day, Gruppenkommandeur Wilhelm-Ferdinand Galland was killed in action. Galland was temporarily succeeded by Naumann until Oberstleutnant Johannes Seifert took command on II. Gruppe on 9 September. During this brief period, command of 6. Staffel was given to Oberleutnant Waldemar Radener. On 1 October, as part of the group expansion from three Staffeln per Gruppe to four Staffeln per Gruppe, Naumann's 6. Staffel was renamed to 7. Staffel. On 9 February 1944, Naumann again temporarily took command of II. Gruppe. Its former commander, Major Wilhelm Gäth had been wounded in combat on 14 January and was grounded. Naumann was officially appointed Gruppenkommandeur of II. Gruppe on 2 March. On 14 October, during the second Schweinfurt raid also called "Black Thursday", Naumann claimed his fifth heavy bomber, a B-17 bomber shot down near Domburg.

On 1 September 1944, Naumann was transferred to take command of II. Gruppe of Jagdgeschwader 6 (JG 6—6th Fighter Wing). He replaced Hauptmann Willi Elstermann who had been transferred.

Later life and service
From 1 April 1963 to 15 July 1966, Naumann served as an advisor with the German Air Staff for international collaboration. Since April 1959, the Bundesluftwaffe formed three Staffeln for rescue and utility transport and liaison purposes. These units were based at Faßberg Air Base, Lechfeld Air Base and Fürstenfeldbruck Air Base, flying the Bell H-13 Sioux, Bristol Type 171 Sycamore, Aérospatiale Alouette II, Sikorsky S-58, and Vertol H-21 helicopters, as well as the Dornier Do 27 aircraft for liaison duties. On 1 October 1966, these units were consolidated and reformed as Helicopter Transport Wing 64 at Landsberg-Lech Air Base, formerly known as Penzing Air Base, and placed under the command of Oberst Naumann.

Naumann credited his father with inspiring him to become a fighter pilot. In May 2008, interviewer James Holland asked Naumann why he wanted to fly fighters, to which he responded, "The most important reason was that my father was a pilot in the 1st World War.  My father told me a lot of his experiences, so it was not a difficult decision for me." Naumann went on to fly both the Me 109 and the Fw 190 in combat during World War II, and while he also trained on the Me 262, he never flew the jet operationally.

Summary of career

Aerial victory claims
According to Obermaier, Naumann was credited with 34 aerial victories all which claimed in approximately 350 combat missions over the Western Front, including seven heavy bombers. Mathews and Foreman, authors of Luftwaffe Aces — Biographies and Victory Claims, researched the German Federal Archives and found records for 34 aerial victories, plus one further unconfirmed claim. All of his aerial victories were claimed over the Western Allies and includes seven four-engined bombers.

Awards
 Honor Goblet of the Luftwaffe on 25 June 1943 as Oberleutnant and pilot
 German Cross in Gold on 31 August 1943 as Hauptmann in the 6./Jagdgeschwader 26
 Knight's Cross of the Iron Cross  on 9 November 1944 as Hauptmann and Gruppenkommandeur  of the II./Jagdgeschwader 6

Notes

References

Citations

Bibliography

 
 
 
 
 
 
 
 
 
 * 
 
 
 
 
 
 
 

1917 births
2010 deaths
Military personnel from Dresden
Luftwaffe pilots
German World War II flying aces
Recipients of the Gold German Cross
Recipients of the Knight's Cross of the Iron Cross
People from the Kingdom of Saxony